The second Hawke ministry (Labor) was the 55th ministry of the Government of Australia. It was led by the country's 23rd Prime Minister, Bob Hawke. The second Hawke ministry succeeded the first Hawke ministry, which dissolved on 13 December 1984 following the federal election that took place on 1 December. The ministry was replaced by the third Hawke ministry on 24 July 1987 following the 1987 federal election.

Cabinet

Outer ministry

See also
 First Hawke ministry
 Third Hawke ministry
 Fourth Hawke ministry

Notes

Ministries of Elizabeth II
1984 establishments in Australia
1987 disestablishments in Australia
Hawke, 2
Australian Labor Party ministries
Ministry, Hawke 2
Cabinets established in 1984
Cabinets disestablished in 1987